The 1831 Coronation Honours were appointments by King William IV to various orders and honours on the occasion of his coronation on 8 September 1831. The honours were published in The London Gazette on 16 September and 27 September 1831.

The recipients of honours are displayed here as they were styled before their new honour, and arranged by honour, with classes (Knight, Knight Commander, etc.) and then divisions as appropriate.

United Kingdom and British Empire

Baronet

Lieutenant-General John Slade
Lieutenant-General Sir William Anson  of Birchhall, in the county palatine of Lancaster
Lieutenant-General Kenneth Mackenzie, of Glenbervie, in the county of Kincardine
Vice-Admiral Sir Robert Waller Otway  of Brighthelmstone, in the county of Sussex
Major-General Sir Archibald Campbell  and Lieutenant-Governor of New Brunswick
Augustus John Foster, of Stone House, in the county of Louth, His Majesty's Envoy Extraordinary and Minister Plenipotentiary to the King of Sardinia
Sir James McGrigor  of Campden Hill, in the county of Middlesex, Director-General of the Army Medical Department
Robert Way Harty, of Prospect House, Roebuck, in the county of Dublin Lord Mayor of Dublin
Colonel John Thomas Jones, of Cranmer Hall, in the county of Norfolk
Robert Greenhill-Russell, of Checquers Court, in the county of Buckingham
William Chaytor, of Croft, in the county of York, and of Witton Castle, in the county of Durham
William Wrixon-Becher, of Ballygiblin, in the county of Cork
Joseph Birch, of the Hazles, in the county palatine of Lancaster
Robert Campbell, of Carrick Buoy, in the county of Donegal
Wilfrid Lawson, of Brayton House, in the county of Cumberland
John Nugent Humble, of Cloncoskoran, in the county of Waterford
James Martin Lloyd, of Lancing, in the county of Sussex
James Gibson-Craig, of Riccaiton, in the county of Mid-Lothian
Joseph Barrington, of the city of Limerick
Theodore Henry Lavington Broadhead, of Burton, or Monk-Bretton, in the county of York
John Colman Rashleigh, of Prideaux, in the county of Cornwall
Duncan Campbell, of Barcaldine, in the county of Argyll
Percy Fitzgerald Nugent, of Donore, in the county of Westmeath
John James Garbett Walsham, of Knill Court, in the county of Hereford
William Heygate, of Southend, in the county of Essex, one of the Aldermen of the city of London
Thomas McKenny, one of the Aldermen of the city of Dublin
Henry Meux, of Theobald's Park, in the county of Hertford
Charles Mansfield Clarke  of Dunham Lodge, in the county of Norfolk, one of the Physicians in Ordinary to Her Majesty

Knight Bachelor

George Magrath  and Surgeon in the Royal Navy
Lieutenant-Colonel Frederic Smith, Commanding Engineer of the London District, Knight of the Royal Hanoverian Guelphic Order
Lieutenant-Colonel Alexander Anderson   Knight of the Royal Portuguese Military Order of the Tower and Sword
Thomas Brancker, Mayor of Liverpool
Robert Gill, Lieutenant of His Majesty's Guard of Yeomen of the Guard
Henry Cipriani, Senior Exon of His Majesty's Guard of Yeomen of the Guard
Henry Bromley Hinrich, Lieutenant of His Majesty's Honourable Band of Gentlemen Pensioners
Richard Burton, Senior Member of His Majesty's Honourable of Gentlemen Pensioners
Colonel Michael McCreagh   of the 13th Light Infantry Regiment Knight Commander of the Royal Portuguese Military Order of the Tower and Sword, and Knight Commander of the Royal Guelphic Order

The Most Honourable Order of the Bath

Knight Commander of the Order of the Bath (KCB)

Military Division

East India Company
Major-General Alexander Knox, of the Bengal Infantry
Major-General John W. Adams  of the Bengal Infantry
Major-General Henry Worsley  of the Bengal Infantry
Major-General Hopetoun S. Scott  of the Madras Infantry
Major-General Robert Scot  of the Madras Infantry
Major-General Andrew McDowall  of the Madras Infantry

Companion of the Order of the Bath (CB)

Military Division
Royal Navy

Captain Richard Curry
Captain the Honourable Frederick Paul Irby
Captain Daniel Woodriff
Captain James Sanders
Captain the Honourable George Elliot
Captain Hugh Pigot
Captain Salusbury Pryce Humphreys
Captain John Tower
Captain William Hennah
Captain William Pryce Cumby
Captain the Honourable Josceline Percy
Captain Andrew King

Army
Colonel Richard Payne, of Hompesch's Rifles
Colonel Charles Nicol, 66th Foot
Colonel Henry King, 82nd Foot
Colonel Frederick Rennell Thackeray, Royal Engineers
Colonel John Boscawen Savage, Royal Marines
Colonel John Francis Birch, Royal Engineers
Colonel Henry Phillott, Royal Artillery
Colonel Robert McCleverty, Royal Marines
Colonel William Howe Knight Erskine, Bradshaw's Levy
Colonel the Honourable Lincoln Stanhope, Unattached
Colonel John Grey, 5th Foot
Colonel Sir Henry Watson  Portuguese Service
Colonel Charles Ashe à Court, 1st Greek Light Infantry
Colonel Charles William Pasley, Royal Engineers
Colonel John Gillies, 40th Foot
Colonel Henry Charles Edward Vernon Graham, Unattached
Colonel Sir Robert John Harvey, Portuguese Service
Colonel Robert Waller, Assistant Quartermaster-General
Colonel Alexander Thomson, 98th Foot
Colonel John Duffy, Unattached
Colonel Jacob Tonson, 37th Foot
Colonel William Alexander Gordon, 95th Foot
Colonel Lord George William Russell, Unattached
Colonel James Fergusson, 52nd Foot
Colonel Andrew Creagh, 81st Foot
Colonel Robert Pym, Royal Artillery
Colonel Archibald Campbell, 46th Foot
Lieutenant-Colonel Richard Gubbins,  14th Foot
Lieutenant-Colonel Thomas Hunter Blair, Unattached
Lieutenant-Colonel Robert Lisle, 19th Dragoons
Lieutenant-Colonel William G. Power, Royal Artillery
Lieutenant-Colonel William Balvaird, Unattached
Lieutenant-Colonel John Macdonald, 92nd Foot
Lieutenant-Colonel Edward Fanshawe, Royal Engineers
Lieutenant-Colonel William Cardon Seton, 88th Foot
Lieutenant-Colonel Elias Lawrence, Royal Marines
Lieutenant-Colonel William Cuthbert Elphinstone-Holloway, Royal Engineers
Lieutenant-Colonel Charles Stuart Campbell, 1st Foot
Lieutenant-Colonel George Turner, Royal Artillery
Lieutenant-Colonel Thomas Alston Brandreth, Royal Artillery
Lieutenant-Colonel Patrick Campbell, 52nd Foot
Lieutenant-Colonel James Bogle, Unattached
Lieutenant-Colonel John Michell, Royal Artillery
Lieutenant-Colonel Edward Charles Whinyates, Royal Artillery
Major Sir John Scott Lillie  31st Foot
Major Thomas Adams Parke, Royal Marines
Major Henry Ross Gore, 89th Foot

East India Company
Colonel John Rose, of the Bengal Infantry
Colonel Gervase Pennington, of the Bengal Artillery
Colonel James D. Greenhill, of the Madras Infantry
Colonel John Doveton, of the Madras Cavalry
Colonel Fortunatus Hagley Pierce, of the Bombay Artillery
Colonel Robert Pitman, of the Bengal Infantry
Colonel Hastings M. Kelly, of the Madras Infantry
Colonel John Mayne, of the Bombay Infantry
Colonel William Conrad Faithfull, of the Bengal Infantry
Lieutenant-Colonel Francis W. Wilson, of the Madras Infantry
Lieutenant-Colonel Alexander Lindsay, of the Bengal Artillery
Lieutenant-Colonel Henry T. Roberts, of the Bengal Cavalry
Lieutenant-Colonel James Caulfield, of the Bengal  Cavalry
Lieutenant-Colonel Richard Tickell, of the Bengal Engineers
Lieutenant-Colonel Charles Fitzgerald, of the Bengal Cavalry
Lieutenant-Colonel Samuel Hughes, of the Bombay Infantry
Lieutenant-Colonel Robert Smith, of the Bengal Engineers
Major Alexander Manson, of the Bombay Artillery
Major James Nesbitt Jackson, of the Bengal Infantry
Major Archibald Irvine, of the Bengal Engineers

References

1831
1831 awards
1831 in the United Kingdom
September 1831 events